Macky Ali (born Maqdoom Ali) was an Indian actor. He was the third son of India's ace comedian Mehmood Ali and younger brother of singer Lucky Ali.

Early and personal life
Ali was the third of the eight children of the popular Bollywood actor, Mehmood. His mother Mahelaka, was part Bengali and part Pathan, the sister of the popular Indian actress of the 1960s – Meena Kumari. The Bollywood actress and dancer, Minoo Mumtaz, was his paternal aunt.

Career
Macky Ali made his debut as a child artiste in Kunwara Baap (1974 film). Macky, who was affected by polio since birth, had starred in the film Kunwara Baap, made by his father, who drew a lot from Macky's life story and struggle during the making of the film. Mehmood made the film in awareness of the disease, polio that had affected his own son. Kunwara Baap had special appearances from actors Sanjeev Kumar, Vinod Mehra, Amitabh Bachchan, Dharmendra, Vinod Khanna, Hema Malini, Dara Singh, Lalita Pawar, Yogita Bali and Mukri. Music composer Rajesh Roshan was introduced with this film.

Macky Ali also acted in the 1978 movie Ek Baap Chhe Bete, starring his father along with all his brothers.

Macky left with his bags and ran away from his home between 1984 and 1989. His whereabouts were unknown to his father for 5 years.

Ali also made an appearance in the music video album "Yaro sab dua karo" and subsequently came out with his own album "Shayad".

Death
Macky died on the way to Mumbai Airport by Cardiac Arrest on 31 August 2002 at the age 31.

Filmography

See also 
 Mehmood Ali Family
 Minoo Mumtaz
 List of Hindi film clans

References

External links
 

20th-century Indian male actors
Male actors from Mumbai
Male actors in Hindi cinema
1970s births
2002 deaths